Joaquín Madrigal (born 17 December 1934) is a Mexican equestrian. He competed in two events at the 1964 Summer Olympics.

References

1934 births
Living people
Mexican male equestrians
Olympic equestrians of Mexico
Equestrians at the 1964 Summer Olympics
Place of birth missing (living people)